Kevin Jackson (born 1984) is an Australian ballet dancer and choreographer, a principal artist with The Australian Ballet.

Biography
Born in Perth, Jackson commenced his dance training at the age of seven with the Shirley Farrell Academy of Dance. He started training at The Australian Ballet School at age 15. In 2002 he graduated from The Australian Ballet School; he joined The Australian Ballet in 2003 and was promoted to principal artist in 2010. In his time with the company, he has performed many lead roles in both classical and contemporary works by choreographers including John Neumeier, Alexei Ratmansky, Wayne McGregor, Jiří Kylián and Graeme Murphy.

In 2014, Jackson became the second Australian Ballet dancer (after Steven Heathcote) to make a guest appearance with the American Ballet Theatre, as Des Grieux in Kenneth MacMillan's Manon.

In 2016, Jackson made a guest appearance in Houston Ballet, as The Prince in Stanton Welch's The Nutcracker.

Jackson holds a Vocational Graduate Diploma in Elite Dance Instruction from The Australian Ballet School.

Selected repertoire
George Balanchine's Apollo, 2007
Jerome Robbins’ A Suite of Dances, 2008
des Grieux in Kenneth MacMillan's Manon 2008
Prince Siegfried in Graeme Murphy's Swan Lake, 2009
Romeo in Graeme Murphy's Romeo & Juliet, 2011
Onegin and Lenksy in John Cranko's Onegin, 2012
Oberon in Frederick Ashton's The Dream, 2015
Albrecht in Maina Gielgud's Giselle, 2015
Prince Désiré in David McAllister's The Sleeping Beauty, 2015
Vaslav Nijinsky in John Neumeier's Nijinsky, 2016

Source:

Choreography
Encomium for Bodytorque.Muses, 2011
Enter Closer for Bodytorque.2.2, 2009

Source:

Awards
Khitercs Hirai Foundation Scholarship 2007
Telstra Ballet Dancer Award 2008

Source:

References

External links
 Cupcakes & Conversation with Kevin Jackson. Ballet News. 6 December 2010. "It's the technique, precision, emotion and connection with your partner that I love about ballet."

Australian male ballet dancers
Australian choreographers
Dancers of the Australian Ballet
Living people
1984 births
People from Perth, Western Australia
Telstra Ballet Dancer Award winners
Australian LGBT entertainers
Helpmann Award winners